The women's 5000 metres at the 2011 IPC Athletics World Championships was held at the QEII Stadium on 22 January 2011.

Medalists

T54
The Women's 5000 metres, T54 was held on January 22

T54 = normal upper limb function, partial to normal trunk function. May have significant function of the lower limbs.

Results

Final

Key:   CR = Championship Record

Splits

References
Complete Results Book from the 2011 IPC Athletics World Championships
Official site of the 2011 IPC Athletics World Championships

5000 metres
2011 in women's athletics
5000 metres at the World Para Athletics Championships